Grégoire Demoustier (born 26 January 1991 in Villeneuve-d'Ascq) is a French racing driver, who competes in the World Touring Car Championship for Sébastien Loeb Racing.

Career
Demoustier began his career in 2008, competing in the THP Spider Cup and the Mitjet Series. In 2009 he debuted in single-seaters, racing in Formula BMW Europe. In 2010 he began taking part in GT racing, contesting the FFSA GT Championship in an Aston Martin DBRS9 for the LMP Motorsport team, and co-driven by Grégory Guilvert. He also took part in the 24 Hours of Spa, finishing 21st in a Gulf Team First Lamborghini Gallardo LP560 GT3. He also raced in the final four rounds of the FIA GT3 European Championship, the first two in a Graff Racing Corvette Z06.R GT3 and the final two in a Team Rosberg Audi R8 LMS.

Demoustier began 2011 with a brief return to single-seaters in Formula Renault 2.0 Alps. He headed back to GT3 for the third round of the season, racing a Mercedes-Benz SLS AMG GT3 for Graff Racing. He took a podium at the season finale when he switched cars within the team to partner Mike Parisy, who claimed the series runner-up spot in the process.

In 2012 Demoustier raced in the FIA GT1 World Championship for Hexis Racing in their McLaren MP4-12C GT3.

The driver competed in the 2012, 2013 and 2014 Blancpain Endurance Series for ART Grand Prix with a McLaren MP4-12C, winning the 2014 Blancpain 3 Hours of Monza. In 2014 he also drove an ART McLaren at the European Le Mans Series.

In 2015 he remained in the Blancpain Endurance Series, switching to a Saintéloc Audi R8. Also, he drove a Chevrolet Cruze at the World Touring Car Championship. Demoustier returned to Saintéloc for the 2023 season, pairing with Christopher Mies in the Sprint Cup and joining Erwan Bastard and Paul Evrard in a Silver Cup entry for the Endurance Cup.

Complete GT1 World Championship results
(key) (Races in bold indicate pole position) (Races in italics indicate fastest lap)

Complete FIA GT Series results
(key) (Races in bold indicate pole position) (Races in italics indicate fastest lap)

† Demoustier was a guest driver at the Navarra round making him ineligible for points.

Complete British GT Championship results
(key) (Races in bold indicate pole position) (Races in italics indicate fastest lap)

Complete World Touring Car Championship results
(key) (Races in bold indicate pole position) (Races in italics indicate fastest lap)

† Did not finish the race, but was classified as he completed over 90% of the race distance.

Complete FIA World Rallycross Championship results
(key)

Supercar

† 10 Championship points deducted for sealing an additional turbo after scrutineering.

Complete TCR International Series results
(key) (Races in bold indicate pole position) (Races in italics indicate fastest lap)

† Did not finish the race, but was classified as he completed over 90% of the race distance.

References

External links
 

1991 births
Living people
People from Villeneuve-d'Ascq
French racing drivers
Formula BMW Europe drivers
Formula Renault 2.0 WEC drivers
Formula Renault Eurocup drivers
FIA GT1 World Championship drivers
Formula Renault 2.0 NEC drivers
Formula Renault 2.0 Alps drivers
Blancpain Endurance Series drivers
European Le Mans Series drivers
24 Hours of Spa drivers
World Touring Car Championship drivers
World Rallycross Championship drivers
Sportspeople from Nord (French department)
W Racing Team drivers
Sébastien Loeb Racing drivers
Belgian racing drivers
Tech 1 Racing drivers
ART Grand Prix drivers
Graff Racing drivers
Team Rosberg drivers
Double R Racing drivers
24H Series drivers
GT4 European Series drivers
Craft-Bamboo Racing drivers
Saintéloc Racing drivers